The 1944–45 Taça de Portugal was the seventh season of the Taça de Portugal (English: Portuguese Cup), the premier Portuguese football knockout competition, organized by the Portuguese Football Federation (FPF). Benfica was the defending champion but lost in the semi-finals to Sporting Clube de Portugal. The final was played on 1 July 1945 between Sporting Clube de Portugal and Sporting Clube Olhanense.

Participating Teams

Primeira Divisão 
(10 Teams)
Associação Académica de Coimbra – Organismo Autónomo de Futebol
Clube de Futebol Os Belenenses
Sport Lisboa e Benfica
Grupo Desportivo Estoril Praia
Sporting Clube Olhanense
Futebol Clube do Porto
Sport Comércio e Salgueiros
Sporting Clube de Portugal
Vitória Sport Clube "de Guimarães"
Vitória Futebol Clube "de Setúbal"

Segunda Divisão 
(6 Teams)
Atlético Clube de Portugal 
Boavista Futebol Clube
Grupo Desportivo da CUF "Lisboa"
Luso Sport Clube "Beja"
Sport Lisboa e Elvas
União Desportiva Oliveirense

First round

Results

|}

First round play-off

Quarterfinals

Results

|}

Semifinals

Results

|}

Semifinal play-off

Final

References

External links
Official webpage 
1944–45 Taça de Portugal at zerozero.pt 

Taça de Portugal seasons
Port
Taca